Actor in Law is a 2016 Pakistani socio-comedy film directed by Nabeel Qureshi, co-written and produced by Fizza Ali Meerza along with Mehdi Ali. The film was released on Eid-ul-Adha 2016. by Urdu 1 Pictures. The film stars Fahad Mustafa and Mehwish Hayat in lead roles. It also stars veteran Indian actor Om Puri in his first Pakistani film, who died on 6 January 2017 suffering Cardiac arrest. On 19 April 2017, it received the Best Film award at the 16th Lux Style Awards.

Plot
Fahad Mustafa stars as an up-and-coming lawyer who employs theatrics and over-the-top one-liners in the courtroom. He aspires to become an actor, something which is met with disapproval from his father. His world is turned upside down when he is faced with a case that shakes the foundation of the country and threatens his career and family. Will he be able to use his theatricality and knowledge of the law to ensure justice?

The film also fictionally portraits the celebrities in Pakistan such as Ayyan and news anchor Mubashir Lucman.

Cast
Fahad Mustafa as Shan Mirza
Om Puri as Rafaqat Mirza
Mehwish Hayat as Meenu Screwala
Lubna Aslam as Shan's mother 
Saboor Ali as Annie Mirza
Alyy Khan as Muddasir Sultan
Irfan Motiwala as Fridge Man
Saife Hassan as Guddu Mamu
Saleem Mairaj as Mehboob Bhai
 Anoushay Abbasi as Meenu's Friend
Kaizer Behram Irani as Meenu's Mother
 Noor ul Hassan
Ahson Talish as a Politician

Special appearance
Humayun Saeed as himself
Mahira Khan as herself
Nayyar Ejaz as a Lawyer 
Rehan Sheikh as a Lawyer
Talat Hussain as a Judge
Atif Aslam as himself in music video "Dil Yeh Dancer Hogaya"
Nabeel Qureshi as himself in title song "Actor in Law"
 Ali Zafar as himself on Billboard 
 Imran Abbas as himself on billboard 
 Ayeza Khan as herself on billboard
Annas Kashif as himself

Development and production
The film is directed by Nabeel Qureshi and produced by Fizza Ali Meerza and Mehdi Ali, making it their second project after Na Maloom Afraad. The details about the film were unveiled by Nabeel Qureshi and Fizza Ali Meerza at a press conference in Karachi on 9 January 2016. The press conference was also attended by Fahad Mustafa, Mehwish Hayat, Alyy Khan and Indian veteran actor Om Puri, who made his Lollywood debut. The producer Fizza also revealed that the film stars Fahad Mustafa and Mehwish Hayat in lead roles. The cast also includes Alyy Khan, Saife Hassan, Saleem Mairaj, Saboor Ali, Anoushay Abbasi and Ahson Talish in important roles. Humayun Saeed, Mahira Khan, Nayyar Ejaz, Talat Hussain, Rehan Sheikh, and Rashid Khawaja all made special appearance in the film. Om Puri told that he signed the film because the script is different and unique. He also told the title Actor in Law is suggested by him. "I didn't know this team personally when I was approached for the film. But I was aware of the fact that Pakistani films have improved a lot." said Puri. The director Nabeel Qureshi said that this film is a different story just like Na Maloom Afraad. "Rather than telling jokes, I enjoy telling stories. And audiences can expect the same with Actor in Law as well since it has a very unique story," said Qureshi. Cinematography was done by Rana Kamran. It was distributed locally and internationally by Urdu 1 Pictures. It was the first film distribution by Urdu 1. The film was released on the occasion of Eid al-Adha in mid 2016.

Production

Filming
The first spell of film was shot in Karachi.

Marketing
Title poster of film was released in February 2016 while the first look poster was revealed on 24 June 2016 via social media. Director claimed that, Indian actor Om Puri will also come to Pakistan for the promotional purpose of his debut Pakistani film. On 28 June 2016, the trailer launch event was held in PC Hotel, Karachi where character posters were also unveiled. According to the Pakistani box office reports, the lollywood movie Actor in Law collected over 100 million in just 5 days in Pakistan which is the second best performance by a Pakistani movie after Jawani Phir Nahi Ani.

Soundtrack

Release
Actor in Law released in UAE, UK, and Middle East on 8 September 2015. The film was released nationwide on 13 September (Eid al-Adha) alongside Azfar Jafi's romantic comedy Janaan and Anjum Shahzad's romantic drama Zindagi Kitni Haseen Hay.

Broadcast Rights
The broadcast rights of the movie were syndicated Urdu1 & Star Gold Middle East.

Home Video
The movie has been made streaming available on Amazon Prime Video.

Reception

Box office
Actor in Law opened to full houses on 13 September 2016. The film managed to exceed expectations and mint  on its first day. Numbers continued to grow on 14 September and the film minted  on its second day. By 18 September 2016, the film had grossed , domestically. On 25 September 2016, Urdu 1 Pictures announced the film had grossed  worldwide.

On 4 October 2016, it was announced that the film had grossed  in Pakistan and Rs 60 million in overseas.

Critical response
The film received mainly positive reviews upon its release with many reviewers praising the blend of social commentary and comedy. Praise was also directed at the performances of Fahad Mustafa and Om Puri.

Dawn'''s Salima Feerasta rated the film 4 out of 5 stars, commenting that the film "makes a strong case for Fahad Mustafa's ascent as cinema's golden boy". Omair Alavi, writing for The News, commended the film for tackling social issues and praised the performances of Fahad Mustafa, Mehwish Hayat and Om Puri. Rafay Mahmood of Express Tribune gave the film 3/5 stars. He felt the film delivered on several accounts but "[didn't] work on as many layers as NMA and [did] not have the same shock value". Sami Saayer, also writing for Express Tribune, was more encouraging of the film, comparing it to "Manmohan Desai's brand of Cinema".

Shahjehan Saleem, writing for HiP, gave the film 4.5/5 and wrote, "Whether it is the language, which borders close to the Karachiwala'' slang, or the rustic urban sprawl of Karachi, where it's based, the film screams life in a metropolis."

Hamza Shafique of Dubai Desi Reviews commented, "Playable Music, believable acting, laugh out loud comedy and stirring messages makes 'Actor in Law' a must go this Eid. I left cinema entertained , I go with 3 desi stars."

Accolades

See also
 List of Pakistani films of 2016

References

External links

2016 films
Courtroom films
Pakistani comedy-drama films
2010s Urdu-language films
Pakistani legal films
2016 comedy-drama films
Lollywood films
Fox Star Studios films
Urdu-language Pakistani films